The Australian Sustainable Communities Tidy Town Awards were launched in 1968 in Western Australia and are an initiative of Keep Australia Beautiful. These awards encourage, motivate and celebrate the achievements of rural and regional communities across Australia. Originally focused on litter reduction and civic pride, they now address the environmental, social and economic sustainability of local rural communities.

External links 
 Keep Australia Beautiful website
 KAB Sustainable Communities Tidy Towns Awards website
 2007 Australian Winner

Tidy Town
Community awards
1968 establishments in Australia
Awards established in 1968